Trevelino/Keller Communications Group is a public relations firm based in Atlanta. The firm has four practices:  Progressive Technologies, Consumer Lifestyle, Business-to-Business, and GreenWorks.

History

Dean Trevelino and Genna Keller, long-standing partners from the 1990s where they met at Shandwick and 1999–2003 where they realigned at Ogilvy, started Trevelino/Keller in 2003. The firm concentrates on emerging and established companies based in the Southeast with a national or international footprint.

Atlas Alliance

A consortium of boutique agencies started in 2005 by Trevelino/Keller, an Atlanta-based national public relations firm. Atlas Alliance consists of UK-based The Word Shop, Atlanta-based Lanza Group, Dubai-based Active PR, Los Angeles-based Platform Media Group and Singapore-based Mileage Communications.

Start-Up Council

The Start-Up Council  was created in 2006 by Trevelino/Keller as a gratis-based initiative to support start-up companies in need of early stage counsel. Led by Trevelino/Keller, the counsel consists of consultants representing public relations, marketing, branding, financial services, human resources, outsourced manufacturing, venture capital, business strategy and legal.  Start-up Council is hosted quarterly by Trevelino/Keller.

References

Marketing companies established in 2003